The 2011 Chattanooga Mocs football team represented the University of Tennessee at Chattanooga as a member of the Southern Conference (SoCon) in the 2011 NCAA Division I FCS football season. The Mocs were led by third-year head coach Russ Huesman and played their home games at Finley Stadium. They finished the season 5–6 overall and 3–5 in SoCon play to tie for sixth place.

Schedule

References

Chattanooga
Chattanooga Mocs football seasons
Chattanooga Mocs football